The New Orleans Upper Central Business District, also known simply as Upper Central Business District, is a historic district of New Orleans, Louisiana which was listed on the National Register of Historic Places (NRHP) in 1990.  The original listed area is roughly bounded by O'Keefe, Poydras, Convention Center Blvd., and the Expressway (B.R. 90).  Along with the NRHP-listed New Orleans Lower Central Business District to the north, across the redeveloped Poydras Street, it is included within the larger New Orleans Central Business District area.

This area combined two previously certified areas, the Warehouse District and the Lafayette Square District.

21 resources in the district were already separately listed on the National Register.
These included:
Julia Street Row, 13 buildings constructed in 1832, NRHP-listed in 1977.
Leeds Iron Foundry (1852), at 923 Tchoupitoulas St.
Gallier Hall (1845), at 545 St. Charles Ave., also known as New Orleans City Hall
St. Patrick's Church (1837), at 724 Camp St.
Federal Fibre Mills Building (1904), at 1101 S. Peters St.

A second boundary increase in 2008 added two more contributing buildings on less than one acre.  The twice-amended district includes 437 contributing buildings and 70 non-contributing ones, one contributing site and one non-contributing one, and three non-contributing structures.

References

National Register of Historic Places in Louisiana
Orleans Parish, Louisiana
Colonial Revival architecture in Louisiana
International style architecture in Louisiana
Italianate architecture in Louisiana
Romanesque Revival architecture in Louisiana
Early Commercial architecture in the United States
Greek Revival architecture in Louisiana
Historic districts in Louisiana